Mo Heart, previously Monique Heart, is the stage name of Kevin Richardson (born May 22, 1986), an American drag queen, reality television personality, and recording artist best known for competing on the tenth season of RuPaul's Drag Race (2018), the fourth season of RuPaul's Drag Race: All Stars (2018–2019), and RuPaul's Drag Race: UK vs the World (2022). Since first appearing on Drag Race in 2018, Heart has appeared in a number of web series produced by World of Wonder, including a starring role in Manic Moments With Monique Heart, and hosted her own podcast, Ace of Hearts with Monique Heart. In January 2019, she released her debut single "Brown Cow Stunning", and later released her debut extended play Beloved SoS 6.3 in 2020.

Early life
Heart was born on May 22, 1986, on Long Island, New York. Heart also spent time in areas in Brooklyn, New York, with his father when he was growing up. Heart was often teased at school for being different. Heart moved to Kansas City, Missouri after graduating from high school and studied the Bible at the International House of Prayer University in Grandview, where he experienced conversion therapy.

Career

Richardson's original drag name was Monique Kutabetch Heart and later changed to Monique Heart. Some of her other rejected drag names were Ariana Styles, Nevah, Jiz Zonra, and Kisha Amillion.<ref>{{Cite web|url=https://attitude.co.uk/article/mo-heart-interview-worst-pick-up-line-someones-said-to-me-youre-my-favourite-monet-x-change-1/26478/|title=MO HEART INTERVIEW: 'WORST PICK-UP LINE SOMEONE'S SAID TO ME? 'YOU'RE MY FAVOURITE, MONÉT X CHANGE!|first=Thomas|last=Stichbury|website=Attitude|date=January 18, 2022|access-date=January 18, 2022}}</ref> He created "Monique Heart" in 2011. Heart began his career as a drag queen at Hamburger Mary's, emceeing bingo and hosting Sunday drag brunch.

Heart first auditioned for the eighth season of RuPaul's Drag Race but was unsuccessful. Two years later, Heart would audition for the tenth season of RuPaul's Drag Race and this time succeeded in qualifying to be a contestant. Before being accepted on the season, Heart was ready to quit drag, but decided to continue. Heart placed eighth overall, after losing a lip sync to "Cut to the Feeling" by Carly Rae Jepsen against The Vixen. Heart was confirmed to be one of the contestants competing in the fourth season of RuPaul's Drag Race: All Stars on November 9, 2018. After not winning any challenges in her original season, Heart won three main challenges during All Stars, eventually reaching Top 4. She was a runner-up alongside Naomi Smalls, finishing in joint 3rd/4th place to Monét X Change and Trinity the Tuck. Her catchphrases on the show were quoted by Rihanna, Alexandria Ocasio-Cortez and Lizzo.

Heart was announced as part of the cast for the first season of RuPaul's Secret Celebrity Drag Race, a Drag Race spin-off where Drag Race alumni transform celebrities into Drag Queens. On March 5 and 6, Heart performed alongside fellow drag race alumni Bebe Zahara Benet, Bob The Drag Queen, The Vixen, Peppermint, and Shea Couleé in the Nubia Tour, a live drag show featuring and produced by black drag queens. In August, Monique will start in her very own World of Wonder Presents web series called Manic Moments with Monique Heart.

In June 2021, Monique Heart was a featured performer for the second annual It Gets Better: A Digital Pride Experience. She hosted her own podcast, Ace of Hearts with Monique Heart. In July 2021, a video of Monique Heart from The Pit Stop with Trixie Mattel went viral after Monique mistakenly referred to Carol Channing as “Cheryl Canning.” 

Monique Heart hosted the Amazon Music original fashion-themed TV series, The Walk In, where she interviewed celebrities as they show off some of their iconic fashion moments throughout their careers. Featured guests included Lil Nas X, Rico Nasty, and Jax. Heart owns her own beauty company, MoBeauty.

In January 2022, she was announced as one of the nine contestants on RuPaul's Drag Race: UK vs the World, now going by the name "Mo Heart". Regarding the name change, Heart said: 

In the semifinal episode, Mo Heart placed in the Top 2, and lipsynced to "Toy" by Netta, and won against Jujubee.

She went onto compete in the top 4 finale and came second to Blu Hydrangea.
Music
Monique Heart performed her debut single "Brown Cow Stunning" on the premiere episode of RuPaul's Drag Race: All-Stars, and was released on January 4, 2019. A music video for the song was released the same day. Heart appeared in the music video for "Soak It Up" by fellow Season 10 contestant Monét X Change and season 8 winner Bob the Drag Queen. On September 4, Heart released another single, "SUKM (Kiss Me)", as well as an accompanying lyric video, the debut single for her EP, Beloved SoS 6.3'', which was released in 2020.

Personal life
Heart first realized he was gay at the age of 17 while working a shift at Burger King. Heart is a Christian. In 2019, Heart moved to Los Angeles, and as of 2021, currently resides in Palm Springs.

Discography

EPs

Singles

As lead artist

Featured singles

Filmography

Film

Television

Music videos

Web series

References

External links

 
 
 

1986 births
People with vitiligo
Living people
African-American Christians
African-American drag queens
Gay entertainers
LGBT Christians
LGBT people from Missouri
LGBT people from New York (state)
People from Brooklyn
People from Kansas City, Missouri
People from Long Island
Monique Heart
Monique Heart